Pavlovo is a southern neighbourhood of Sofia, the capital of Bulgaria. Part of the Vitosha municipality, it borders Buxton Neighbourhood to the northeast, Tsar Boris III Boulevard to the northwest, the Sofia ringroad (in this section known as the Nikola Petkov Boulevard) to the south and the Buxton Boulevard to the east. Pavlovo features mostly low - to mid-rise residential architecture, with houses and small blocks of flats dominating the skyline. The 5th Primary School and the 157th High School César Vallejo serve the neighbourhood.

Gallery

References

 

Neighbourhoods of Sofia